VEAT may refer to:

the airport code for Maharaja Bir Bikram Airport
a Voluntary Ex-Ante Transparency Notice issued under the procedures for government procurement in the European Union